Nithsdale Football Club was an association football club from Dumfries, Scotland.

History

The club was founded in 1885.  It entered the Scottish Cup for the first time in 1886–87, but, having been drawn against the Queen of the South Wanderers F.C., the strongest team in the area, Nithsdale withdrew.

The following two seasons saw the club play its first fixtures; after a bye in the first round in 1887–88, the club lost 9–2 at home to the 5th KRV side, and in the first round in 1888–89 was hammered 13–0 at Newton Stewart Athletic.  

The club's relative ability compared to others in the area was shown by the team losing 13–1 at Moffat in a Churchill Cup tie in 1886, albeit an early injury caused the club to play almost the entire match one short.  Nithsdale would suffer even worse defeats in 1888–89; 14–1 at the 5th KRV in the Southern Counties Charity Cup, and 17–3 at Queen of the South Wanderers in a friendly.

The ultimate humiliation came at the end of season Andrew Lawson Cup competition.  Nithsdale hosted the 5th KRV's second eleven, and lost by the "surprising majority of 27 goals to 1", 18 of which came in the first half.

The club seems to have wound up after that defeat.

Colours

The club's colours were maroon shirts and white shorts.

Ground

The club played at Victoria Park for its first two seasons, moving to the Recreation Grounds in 1887.

References

Defunct football clubs in Scotland
Association football clubs established in 1885
Association football clubs disestablished in 1889
1885 establishments in Scotland
Football clubs in Dumfries and Galloway